The 1994 United States Senate election in Maine was held November 8, 1994. Incumbent Democratic U.S. Senator and Senate Majority Leader George J. Mitchell decided to retire, instead of seeking a third term. Congressman Tom Andrews won the Democratic primary unopposed, while Congresswoman Olympia Snowe won the Republican primary unopposed. In the general election, Snowe defeated Andrews in a rout to win her first of three terms in the United States Senate, a stark contrast to retiring Senator Mitchell's landslide win six years prior.

Democratic primary

Candidates 
 Tom Andrews, U.S. Representative

Results

Republican primary

Candidates 
 Olympia Snowe, U.S. Representative and First Lady of Maine

Results

General election

Polling

Results

See also 
 1994 United States Senate elections

References 

Maine
1994
1994 Maine elections